Anthidium rozeni is a species of bee in the family Megachilidae, the leaf-cutter, carder, or mason bees.

Distribution
Peru

References

rozeni
Insects described in 2001